The following is a list of episodes for the television sitcom The Naked Truth, which ran for three seasons - the first on ABC and the last two on NBC.

Series overview

Episodes

Season 1 (1995–96)

Season 2 (1997)

Season 3 (1997–98)

References

Naked Truth